Oak Creek Power Plant, also known as South Oak Creek, is a base load, coal- and natural gas-fired, electrical power station located on Lake Michigan in Oak Creek, Wisconsin. Oak Creek Power Plant along with Elm Road Generation Station make up the entire Oak Creek Generating Site.

The plant was built for an initial cost of $246 million.

Advanced Air Quality Control Systems (AQCS) were installed in 2012 for $750 million on all four generating units. In 2009, it was listed as the third largest generating station in Wisconsin with a net summer capacity of 1,135 MW. The plant consumes between 6,000 and 6,400 tons of coal daily depending on system demands.

In 2018, the plant was listed as the fifth largest generation station in Wisconsin with an annual generation of 4,767,153 MW-h, behind Point Beach Nuclear Power Plant (10,128,796 MW-h), Elm Road Generating Station (7,913,698 MW-h), Columbia (6,641,670 MW-h), and Port Washington Generating Station (5,829,109 MW-h).

On November 6th, 2020 - A plan was announced that includes the retirement of the 1,100-megawatt South Oak Creek coal plant in southeastern Wisconsin over the next five years.  Units 5 and 6 at South Oak Creek would be shut down in 2023 while units 7 and 8 will be shut down by 2024.

Expansion

In 2005, two 615-megawatt coal-fueled units were constructed just north of the existing Oak Creek facility. Unit 1 began commercial operation on February 2, 2010. with Unit 2 following in 2011.

Units

Electricity Production 
In 2021, Oak Creek Power Station (South Oak Creek Power Plant and Elm Road Generating Station combined) generated 12,180 GWh, approximately 19.46% of the total electric power generated in Wisconsin (62,584 GWh) for that year. The South Oak Creek Power Plant (coal only) had a 2021 annual capacity factor of 61.65% and the Elm Road Generating Station (coal only) had a 2021 annual capacity factor of 69.26%. 

Subnotes:

(1) : Table data reflects electrical generation from coal fuels only (subbituminous coal, refined coal). The plant also generates a minor amount of electricity (less than 1%) from natural gas.

(2) : Major fuel changed from subbituminous coal to refined coal in January 2016. The major fuel changed back to subbituminous coal in March 2022 . 

Subnotes:

1. Table data reflects electrical generation from all coal fuels only (bituminous coal, subbituminous coal, and refined coal). The plant also generates a minor amount of electricity (less than 1%) from natural gas.

Incidents
On February 3, 2009, six contract workers were injured when coal dust ignited in a 65-foot coal dust silo on the power plant site.  They had been preparing the structure for repairs when an unknown source ignited coal dust that had accumulated at the top of the silo.  All suffered burns.

On October 31, 2011, a bluff area roughly the size of a football field and 200 feet above the level of Lake Michigan eroded, washing mud and debris into Lake Michigan. Close to 100 workers were at the site at the time of the collapse; none were hurt or killed.

See also

List of power stations in Wisconsin

References

External links
Oak Creek Power Plant (PDF)
 https://web.archive.org/web/20080513043232/http://www.powerthefuture.net/projects/ocpp.htm
 http://www.powerthefuture.net/qa/genqa_ocexpansion.htm

Energy infrastructure completed in 1959
Energy infrastructure completed in 1961
Energy infrastructure completed in 1965
Energy infrastructure completed in 1967
Energy infrastructure completed in 1968
Buildings and structures in Milwaukee County, Wisconsin
Buildings and structures in Racine County, Wisconsin
Coal-fired power stations in Wisconsin